Hsieh Sheng-feng (born 19 June 1978) is a Taiwanese archer. He competed in the men's individual and team events at the 1996 Summer Olympics.

References

1978 births
Living people
Taiwanese male archers
Olympic archers of Taiwan
Archers at the 1996 Summer Olympics
Place of birth missing (living people)